The Journal of Media Literacy Education is a quarterly open-access, peer-reviewed academic journal that is published by Digital Commons at the University of Rhode Island on behalf of the National Association for Media Literacy Education, a non-profit national membership organization for media literacy education in the United States. In 2022, the co-editors are Maria Ranieri (University of Florence, Italy), Julian McDougall (Bournemouth University), and Lucas Jacob (LaJolla Country Day School). Previous JMLE editors have been recognized by the organization for their  leadership and service.

History 
The journal was established in 2009 by founding co-editors Renee Hobbs (University of Rhode Island) and Amy Petersen Jensen (Brigham Young University)

Editors 
The following persons have been co-editors:

Abstracting and indexing 
The journal is abstracted and indexed in:

 World Cat

See also 

 List of education journals

References

External links 
 

Routledge academic journals
Public administration journals
Quarterly journals
English-language journals
Publications established in 1995